Terry John Bozzio (born December 27, 1950) is an American drummer best known for his work with Missing Persons and Frank Zappa. He has been featured on nine solo or collaborative albums, 26 albums with Zappa and seven albums with Missing Persons. Bozzio has been a prolific sideman, playing on numerous releases by other artists since the mid-1970s. He was inducted into the Modern Drummer Hall of Fame in 1997. His son and stepdaughter are also drummers with the latter, Marina, being a member of the band Aldious.

Biography 

Terry Bozzio was born on December 27, 1950, in San Francisco, California. He started at age 6 playing makeshift drum sets. At the age of 13 he saw the Beatles' premiere performance on The Ed Sullivan Show and begged his father for drum lessons.

In 1968, Bozzio graduated from Sir Francis Drake High School in San Anselmo, California, where he received a music scholarship award, and later went on to the College of Marin. During this time he studied concurrently with Chuck Brown on the drum set and Lloyd Davis and Roland Kohloff on a percussion and timpani scholarship. He also played Bartok-Dahl-Cowell & Baroque chamber ensembles with the Marin and Napa County Symphonies.

1970s 

In 1972, Bozzio played in the rock musicals Godspell and Walking in my Time. He began playing in local jazz groups with Mike Nock, Art Lande, Azteca, Eddie Henderson, Woody Shaw, Julian Priester, Eric Gravatt, Billy Higgins, Andy Narell and Mel Martin. He became a regular in the Monday Night Jim Dukey Big Band at San Francisco's Great American Music Hall.

Bozzio recorded and toured with Frank Zappa beginning in 1975, and appeared, also as a vocalist, on a number of Zappa's most successful albums, including Zoot Allures (1976), Zappa in New York (1976), Sheik Yerbouti (1979) and Thing-Fish (1984), and in the concert movie Baby Snakes (1979) (which includes him singing lead on a portion of the song "Punky's Whips"). Bozzio became a staple of Zappa's live act, not only because of his drumming capability but also by playing the role of the Devil in the song Titties & Beer. The song called for Bozzio to don a devil mask and argued with Zappa's protagonist character, hurling insults at each other throughout.

In 1977, he joined The Brecker Brothers with longtime San Francisco friend and guitarist Barry Finnerty. With The Brecker Brothers, Bozzio toured and recorded the live album Heavy Metal Be-Bop (1978). Shortly after, he was dismissed by Zappa and joined Group 87 with Mark Isham, Peter Maunu, Patrick O'Hearn and Peter Wolf. The group auditioned for and was signed to a record deal with CBS but Bozzio declined membership and then auditioned unsuccessfully for Thin Lizzy.

After Bill Bruford and Allan Holdsworth departed from the band U.K. in late 1978, Bozzio joined Eddie Jobson and John Wetton to continue U.K. as a trio. The trio recorded Danger Money (1979) and a live album Night After Night (1979) and toured the U.S. and Canada twice (supporting the popular progressive rock band Jethro Tull), and in Europe and Japan.

1980s 

After U.K. disbanded in early 1980, Bozzio, ex-Zappa guitarist Warren Cuccurullo and then-wife and vocalist Dale Bozzio founded the band Missing Persons. Missing Persons released the albums Spring Session M (which went Gold), Rhyme & Reason, and Color in Your Life.

After Missing Persons broke up in 1986, Bozzio joined ex-Duran Duran guitarist Andy Taylor's solo band. He also played on sessions with Robbie Robertson, Gary Wright, Don Dokken, XYZ, Paul Hyde, Herbie Hancock, Dweezil Zappa, and Richard Marx.

During this time, Bozzio began touring as a clinician/solo drummer and recorded Solo Drums, which was his first instructional video for Warner Brothers. He joined Mick Jagger and Jeff Beck for the video "Throwaway", and teamed up with Beck and keyboardist Tony Hymas to co-write/produce and perform on the Grammy Award-winning album Jeff Beck's Guitar Shop. The album was promoted on The Arsenio Hall Show, which was Jeff Beck's first-ever live appearance on American television.

He also featured on the album Confetti by Sergio Mendes in 1984.

1990s 
Between 1990 and 1995, Bozzio developed ostinato-based drum solo compositions and recorded his second instructional video Melodic Drumming and the Ostinato Volumes 1, 2, and 3, as well as Solo Drum Music Volumes 1 & 2 on CD. He also joined Tony Hymas, Tony Coe, and Hugh Burns to form the band Lonely Bears and record The Lonely Bears, Injustice, and The Bears are Running, while living in Paris, France. He also formed the band Polytown with David Torn and Mick Karn. In 1993 Terry joined T. M. Stevens and Devin Townsend on Steve Vai's Sex & Religion album.

From 1995 to 2002, Bozzio did tours of the US, Australia, Canada & Europe as a solo drum artist as well as recording two solo CDs: Drawing the Circle and Chamberworks. He was inducted into the Modern Drummer Hall of Fame in 1997. With bassist and Chapman Stick player Tony Levin and guitarist Steve Stevens, he formed the group Bozzio Levin Stevens, which released two albums: Black Light Syndrome in 1997, and Situation Dangerous in 2000.

2000s 

In 2001, he teamed up with Chad Wackerman to produce the Duets video and Alternative Duets CDs. Bozzio won the Clinician of the Year award twice as well as Drum Magazine's Drummer of the Year and Best Clinician. Internationally, he received Slagwerkkrant Magazine's (Netherlands) and Player Magazine's (Japan) Best Drummer Award.

Bozzio was inducted into Guitar Center's RockWalk in Hollywood on January 17, 2007. He worked with the nu metal band Korn on their eighth studio album after the departure of their drummer David Silveria. He was scheduled to play on the road with the band during the Family Values Tour, but he left and was replaced by Joey Jordison of Slipknot and later Ray Luzier.

Selected discography

Solo 
 Solo Drum Music I (1992)
 Solo Drum Music II (1992)
 Drawing the Circle (1998)
 Chamber Works (1998)
 Solos & Duets (with Chad Wackerman) (2001)
 Nine Short Films (with Billy Sheehan) (2002)
 Chamber Works (2005, with Metropole Orchestra)
 Prime Cuts (2005)
 Four from Ten Twenty Nine (2008)
 Seven Nights in Japan (2008)
 Melodic Drumming & the Ostinato v.1. 2. 3. DVD (2011)
 Terry Bozzio Live Performance & Seminar 2 Disc DVD (rec. 2003) (2011)
 Terry Bozzio Live in Japan 2007 菩慈音 (2012)
 Musical Solo Drumming DVD English w/ Japanese subtitles (2012)
 Terry Bozzio – Composer Series / 4CD + Blu-ray + Blu-ray (Audio-only) + Bonus DVD (2015)
 Terry Bozzio – Reality & Simple Moments Compilation CD (2017)

Frank Zappa 

 Bongo Fury (October 1975), US No. 66
 Zoot Allures (October 1976), US No. 71
 Zappa in New York (March 1977), US No. 57
 Studio Tan (1978)
 Sleep Dirt (January 1979), US No. 175
 Sheik Yerbouti (March 1979), US No. 21
 Joe's Garage (September 1979), US No. 27 (vocals only)
 Orchestral Favorites (1979)
 Shut Up 'n Play Yer Guitar (May 1981)
 Baby Snakes (March 1983)
 Thing-Fish (November 1984)
 You Can't Do That on Stage Anymore, Vol. 1 (May 1988)
 You Can't Do That on Stage Anymore, Vol. 3 (November 1989)
 You Can't Do That on Stage Anymore, Vol. 4 (July 1991)
 You Can't Do That on Stage Anymore, Vol. 5 (July 1992)
 You Can't Do That on Stage Anymore, Vol. 6 (July 1992)
 Läther (September 1996)
 Frank Zappa Plays the Music of Frank Zappa: A Memorial Tribute (October 1996)
 The Lost Episodes (1996)
 FZ:OZ (August 2002)
 QuAUDIOPHILIAc (September 2004)
 Trance-Fusion (October 2006)
 One Shot Deal (June 2008)
 Joe's Menage (October 2008)
 Philly '76 (December 2009)
 Hammersmith Odeon (November 2010)
 Baby Snakes: The Compleat Soundtrack (December 2012)
 Halloween 77: The Palladium, NYC (October 2017)
 Zappa in New York 40th Anniversary (March 2019)
 Zappa ’75: Zagreb / Ljubljana (October 2022)

Missing Persons 
 Missing Persons EP (1980) No. 46 US
 Spring Session M (1982) No. 17 US
 Rhyme & Reason (1984) No. 43 US
 Color in Your Life (1986) No. 88 US
 Late Nights Early Days (1999)
 Lost Tracks (2002)

U.K. 
 Danger Money (1979) (Replaced Bill Bruford)
 Night After Night (1979, Live)

Dweezil Zappa 
 Back to the Beach Soundtrack (Wipe Out) with Herbie Hancock (1987)
 My Guitar Wants to Kill Your Mama (1988)
 Shampoohorn (1994)
 Automatic (2000)

Other 

 1974: Born to Love You Luis Gasca
 1977: Deceptive Bends 10CC
 1978: Heavy Metal Be-Bop Brecker Brothers
 1980: Only love can sustain Luis Alberto Spinetta
 1980: Group 87 Group 87
 1986: Andy Taylor Andy Taylor
 1987: Robbie Robertson Robbie Robertson
 1988: Castalia Mark Isham
 1988: Rivers Gonna Rise Patrick O'Hearn
 1988: Who I Am Gary Wright
 1989: Def, Dumb and Blonde Deborah Harry
 1989: El Dorado Patrick O'Hearn
 1989: How Long Michael Thompson
 1989: Jeff Beck's Guitar Shop Jeff Beck & Tony Hymas
 1989: Twins Soundtrack Jeff Beck
 1990: Girlfriend from Hell Jorgenson
 1990: Mark Isham Mark Isham
 1991: Beckology Jeff Beck
 1991: In Your Face Earl Slick
 1991: Rush Street Richard Marx
 1992: Retrograde Planet Zazen
 1992: Vol. Pour Sydney Lonely Bears
 1992: White Sands Soundtrack Patrick O'Hearn
 1993: Sex and Religion Steve Vai
 1994: Big Bang: In the Beginning Was a Drum Compilation
 1994: Hide Your Face hide
 1994: Polytown Polytown
 1995: First Signs of Life Gary Wright
 1995: Thank You Duran Duran
 1995: Trust Patrick O'Hearn
 1997: Black Light Syndrome Bozzio Levin Stevens
 1997: Dream Castles Sly
 1997: Something with a Pulse Mark Craney & Friends
 1998: Age of Impact Explorer's Club
 1998: Best of the Lonely Bears Lonely Bears
 1998: Proof: The Very Best of the Knack The Knack
 1998: Zoom The Knack
 1999: Lonely Bears Lonely Bears
 2000: Injustice Lonely Bears
 2000: Situation Dangerous Bozzio Levin Stevens
 2000: The Bears are Running Lonely Bears
 2001: Compression Billy Sheehan
 2001: Feeding the Wheel Jordan Rudess
 2002: Big Delta Omar & The Howlers
 2002: Delete and Roll Bozzio Preinfalk & Machacek (BPM)
 2002: Queen of the Damned Soundtrack Jonathan Davis, Richard Gibbs
 2002: Raising the Mammoth Explorers Club
 2003: Bozzio – Mastelotto with Pat Mastelotto
 2004: Alamo Soundtrack Carter Burwell
 2004: Boogie Man Omar & The Howlers
 2004: Drum Nation, Vol. 1 Various Artists
 2005: Two Sides of If Vivian Campbell
 2006: Sic Alex Machacek
 2007: Untitled Korn
 2008: Live with the Tosca Strings DVD (2008)
 2012: Efrainization Terry Bozzio/Alex Acuna/Efrain Toro DVD
 2016: Heavy Metal Be-Bop Band Tour in Japan'14 Brecker Brothers (Reunion CD)

References

External links 

 Terry Bozzio – Official site
 Terry Bozzio – Official Facebook
 Terry Bozzio – Official YouTube
 Terry Bozzio – Official Twitter
 Terry Bozzio on Drum Channel
 Terry Bozzio : Sabian Cymbals – Artist Set-up
 Drum Workshop site, artists section : Contains an illustration of Terry Bozzio and other drummers' drum kits
 Terry Bozzio's Discography and Equipment List at BehindTheDrums
 Career Retrospective Interview from January 2016 with Pods & Sods

1950 births
American rock drummers
Missing Persons (band) members
Living people
Drummers from San Francisco
Grammy Award winners
American new wave musicians
American session musicians
Tambourine players
20th-century American drummers
American male drummers
Explorers Club (band) members
U.K. (band) members
Bozzio Levin Stevens members
The Knack members
The Mothers of Invention members
Magna Carta Records artists
HoBoLeMa members
Fantômas (band) members